FC Argeș Piteşti Basketball is a Romanian professional basketball club, based in Piteşti, Romania. The club competes in the Liga Națională, and has also been named in recent years CS Universitatea, BCM Piteşti and BCMUS Argeş Piteşti, CSU Piteşti, BCM U Piteşti and BCM U FC Argeș Piteşti. The team won the Romanian championship in 2000, and qualified for the finals in 2007, losing against CSU Asesoft. Also, the team won the Romanian Cup in the season 2011–2012 and the SuperCup in the season 2012–2013.

History
In 2013 Pitești held the 2013 FIBA Europe Under-20 Championship Division B, Hristu Șapera, BCM U Pitești coach was also the coach of the Romanian National Team Under-20.

Season summaries

2011–2012

In the season: 2011–2012, the team finished on 9th place after the regular season end therefore the team didn't qualify for the Play-Off. In the Romanian Cup the team won the Cup after a great win with 91–78 against BC Timișoara in the final game played at Bucharest.

2012–2013

In the season: 2012–2013, BCM U Piteşti won the Romanian SuperCup after winning against CSU Asesoft. After the regular season end, the team finished on 11th place (13 wins – 17 losses) and went to play with BC Farul Constanța in Play-Out for remaining in the first national division. BCM U Pitesti win with 3–0 against BC Farul Constanta. Also the team participated in EuroChallenge, but finished in the group stage with 1 win and 5 losses.

2013–2014

In the season: 2013–2014, BCM U Pitești qualified in the Final Four of the Romanian Cup after beating U Mobitelco Cluj Napoca in the quarter finals but they lost in the Semi-Finals against CSM Oradea and against CSU Ploiești in the bronze medal game.
After the regular season end, the team finished on 6th place and went to play with BC Mureș in the Play-Offs. BCM U Pitești lost the series with 3–1.

2014–2015

In the season: 2014–2015, BCM U Pitești qualified for the second consecutive year in the Final Four of the Romanian Cup and they finished 3rd after losing against future winner BC Timișoara and won against CSU Sibiu in the small final. In the regular season, the team finished in 5th place but they lost the Play-Off series in the quarter finals against CS Energia Târgu Jiu with a final score: 3–0.

2015–2016

In the season: 2015–2016, Pitești reached the quarter finals of the Romanian Cup but they lost against future winners U BT Cluj Napoca after a last-second point scored. In the regular season they finished on 9th place and didn't qualify for the Play-Offs (Pitești had a 3-point penalty due to a violation regarding the second team a year before).

2016–2017

In the season: 2016–2017, Pitești reached the quarter finals of the Play-Off but they lost against Steaua CSM Bucharest after a 3–0 series. In the Romanian Cup they lost in the first round against SCM U Craiova.

Current roster

Notable former players
- Set a club record or won an individual award as a professional player.
- Played at least one official international match for his senior national team at any time.

Notable former coaches
- Set a club record or won an individual award as a professional head coach.
- Coached as head coach at least one official international match for a senior national team at any time.

Competitive record

Trivale Sports Hall

Trivale Sports Hall is a multi-purpose indoor arena in Pitești, Romania. It is primarily used by BCM U Pitești. It has a capacity of 2,000 seats.

References

External links
 Facebook presentation

Pitești
Basketball teams in Romania
Basketball teams established in 2000
2000 establishments in Romania